Point Venus is a peninsula on the north coast of Tahiti, the largest island in the Windward group of French Polynesia.  It is in the commune of Mahina, approximately 8 km east of the capital Pape'ete.  It lies at the northeast end of Matavai Bay.

History
Cook anchored in Matavai Bay on 12 April 1769 and established an observatory, and a fortified camp called "Fort Venus", at Te Auroa, which they named "Point Venus".

References

Landforms of Tahiti